Sathe is an Indian surname that may refer to the following people:
Anuja Sathe, Indian actress 
Annabhau Sathe (1920–1969), Indian social reformer, poet and writer 
Chandra Sathe (1947–2017), Indian cricket umpire 
Keshav Sathe (1928–2012), Indian tabla player 
Madhukar Sathe (born 1934), Indian cricketer
Mukund Sathe (1937–2015), Indian cricketer
Ram Sathe (1923–2008), Indian Foreign Secretary 
Ravindra Sathe, Indian playback singer 
Sadashiv Sathe (born 1926), Indian sculptor
Shridhar Sathe (1950–2019), Indian-born American food scientist 
Shrihari Sathe, Indian filmmaker and producer
Vasant Sathe (1925–2011), Indian politician
Avadhut Sathe, Master Indian Trader and Trainer based in Mumbai

See also
Sathi (disambiguation)